Cornacchini is an Italian surname. Notable people with the surname include:

Agostino Cornacchini (1686–1754), Italian sculptor and painter
Giovanni Cornacchini (born 1965), Italian footballer and manager

Italian-language surnames